VH1 Storytellers is a live and video album by Ringo Starr recorded and released for the popular music program in 1998. Unlike his previous live recordings, this release places Starr in an intimate environment where, as per the show's requirement, he tells the genesis of the songs being performed.

Recording
Recorded a month before the release of Starr's new studio album Vertical Man – and performed in promotion for it – VH1 Storytellers features Starr's contemporary musical collaborator Mark Hudson (who produced this set) and Starr's current band, dubbed "the Roundheads". Aside from songs that appeared on Vertical Man, much of the set is devoted to Starr's Beatles and early solo successes with Starr relating their stories in a relaxed, and sometimes humorous, fashion.

Release and reception
This marked the last time a Ringo Starr album was released on a pre-recorded cassette in the United States, according to journalist Peter Palmiere. However, some countries in the Far East still issue cassettes of recent Ringo Starr material including Ringo Rama, Choose Love and Photograph: The Very Best of Ringo Starr.

VH1 Storytellers was released by Mercury Records in the US on 20 October 1998. The album failed to chart. Entertainment Weeklys reviewer wrote: "It's his yarns, though, that are most engaging … A nice retrospective of an under appreciated composer."

Album Track listing

Live Track Listing
"With a Little Help from My Friends" (Lennon–McCartney)
"Back Off Boogaloo" (Starkey)
"Don't Pass Me By" (Starkey)
"It Don't Come Easy" (Starkey)
"Octopus's Garden" (Starkey)
"Photograph" (Starkey/Harrison)
"La De Da" (Starkey/Mark Hudson/Steve Dudas/Dean Grakal)
"King of Broken Hearts" (Starkey/Hudson/Dudas/Grakal)
"Love Me Do" (Lennon–McCartney)
"With a Little Help from My Friends (Reprise)" (Lennon–McCartney)

Personnel
Ringo Starr – lead vocals, drums, piano on "Don't Pass Me By"
Joe Walsh – guitar, backing vocals
Mark Hudson – guitar, harmonica, backing vocals
Gary Burr – guitar, mandolin, backing vocals
Steve Dudas – guitar
Jack Blades – bass, backing vocals
 Jim Cox – keyboards, backing vocals
Scott Gordon – harmonica
Simon Kirke – drums, percussion

References
 Footnotes

 Citations

Albums produced by Mark Hudson (musician)
1998 live albums
Ringo Starr live albums
Mercury Records live albums
VH1 Storytellers

es:VH1 Storytellers